In the 2002–03 season, José Mourinho's Porto won the Primeira Liga, Taça de Portugal and the UEFA Cup.

Winning roster
FC PORTO: Dmitri Alenichev, Bruno, Buszáky, Cândido Costa, Capucho, César Peixoto, Clayton, Costinha, Deco, Derlei, Elias, Hélder Postiga, Hugo Luz, Edgaras Jankauskas, Jorge Costa, Maniche, Marco Ferreira, Mário Silva, Nuno, Nuno Valente, Paulinho Santos, Pedro Emanuel, Reinaldo, Ricardo Carvalho, Ricardo Costa, Secretário, Tiago e Vítor Baía.

Manager: José Mourinho

Primeira Liga

Taça de Portugal

Round of 16 to Final

Porto's UEFA Cup Run

|}

Supertaça Cândido de Oliveira
Held on 18 August, double-winners Sporting CP defeated cup runners-up Leixões 5–1 to complete a clean sweep of domestic honours for the calendar year of 2002.

 
Seasons in Portuguese football
Football
Football
Portuguese football